Martin Meehan may refer to:

Marty Meehan (born 1956), former U.S. Representative from Massachusetts and current Chancellor of the University of Massachusetts, Lowell
Martin Meehan (Irish republican) (1945–2007), Provisional Irish Republican Army member and Sinn Féin politician for South Antrim